Igor Pescialli (born 28 July 1963) is an Italian rower. He won a gold medal at the 1986 World Rowing Championships in Nottingham with the men's double sculls.

References

1963 births
Living people
Italian male rowers
World Rowing Championships medalists for Italy